Khady Hane (born 1962) is an author from Senegal. She received her education from the University of Paris and lives in Paris. She is president of an association called "Black Arts and Culture" and has written a number of novels in French.

Bibliography
Sous le regard des étoiles... [Under the gaze of the stars]. Dakar: NEAS, 1998 (Novel). 
Les violons de la haine Paris: Manuscrit.com, 2001. Novel. 
Ma sale peau noire Paris: Manuscrit.com, 2001. Novel.
Le Collier de paille Libreville: Editions Ndzé, 2002. (183p.).  Novel. 
Il y en a trop dans les rues de Paris Bertoua, Cameroun: Editions Ndzé, 2005, (78p.) . Theatre.

External links
Profile at UWA

1962 births
Living people
Senegalese women writers
University of Paris alumni
Senegalese novelists